Curtis Millage (born May 4, 1981) is an American professional basketball player for who last played for AZS Koszalin  of the Polish Basketball League. He played college basketball for Arizona State.

Pro career
After finishing his college basketball career at Arizona State, Millage turned pro. He has since played in China, Croatia, Ukraine and Latvia. In the 2006–07 and 2007-08 seasons he played with ASK Riga. In October 2008, he signed a contract for one season with the Russian team Enisey Krasnoyarsk. After one season in Russia he signed with Slovenian club Union Olimpija which plays in Euroleague. In 2009, he signed in Hyères Toulon Var Basket in France. In August 2011 he signed a one-year deal with BK VEF Rīga.

In September 2012, he signed with Armia Tbilisi. In January 2013, he signed with BC Donetsk. In September 2013, he signed with Torku Selçuk Üniversitesi. He parted ways with them in November 2013, after playing only 5 games. In December 2013, Millage signed a one-month deal with BC Kalev/Cramo. In October 2014, he signed with U BT Cluj-Napoca of Romania.

On November 2, 2016, Millage signed with Hoops Club. On December 15, 2016, he left Hoops Club and signed with Polish club AZS Koszalin.

Millage announced his retirement from basketball in 2017. On July 8, 2019, Millage was hired as head coach of men's basketball for Shadow Mountain High School, following the departure of former NBA player Mike Bibby.

References

External links
Arizona State Profile
Euroleague.net Profile
Eurobasket.com Profile
FIBA.com Profile

1981 births
Living people
ABA League players
African-American basketball players
American expatriate basketball people in China
American expatriate basketball people in Croatia
American expatriate basketball people in Estonia
American expatriate basketball people in France
American expatriate basketball people in Georgia (country)
American expatriate basketball people in Germany
American expatriate basketball people in Latvia
American expatriate basketball people in Lebanon
American expatriate basketball people in Poland
American expatriate basketball people in Romania
American expatriate basketball people in Russia
American expatriate basketball people in Slovenia
American expatriate basketball people in Turkey
American expatriate basketball people in Ukraine
American men's basketball players
Arizona State Sun Devils men's basketball players
ASK Riga players
AZS Koszalin players
BC Donetsk players
BC Enisey players
BC Kalev/Cramo players
BC Khimik players
BK VEF Rīga players
CS Universitatea Cluj-Napoca (men's basketball) players
Fayetteville Patriots players
HTV Basket players
Junior college men's basketball players in the United States
KK Olimpija players
KK Split players
Korvpalli Meistriliiga players
Point guards
S.Oliver Würzburg players
Stal Ostrów Wielkopolski players
Zhejiang Golden Bulls players
21st-century African-American sportspeople
20th-century African-American people